Uscio is a comune (municipality) in the Metropolitan City of Genoa in the Italian region Liguria, located about  east of Genoa.

Uscio borders the following municipalities: Avegno, Lumarzo, Neirone, Sori, Tribogna.

References

Cities and towns in Liguria